Sabine Appelmans was the defending champion, but did not compete this year.

Yayuk Basuki won the title by defeating Marianne Werdel 6–3, 6–1 in the final.

Seeds

Draw

Finals

Top half

Bottom half

References

External links
 Official results archive (ITF)
 Official results archive (WTA)

Singles
Volvo Women's Open - Singles
 in women's tennis